Koněprusy Caves is a cave system in the heart of the limestone region known as Bohemian Karst in the Central Bohemian Region of the Czech Republic.

The caves
A hill called Zlatý kůň (Golden Horse) rises above the village of Koněprusy close to another hill called Kobyla (Mare), and nearby is a place called V koníku (In a Little Horse). A short journey westward leads to Kotýz, a karst plateau. Many legends have been woven about Kotýz and one of them tells about sacred horses used by the Celts for campaigns of war. A prehistoric settlement existed here, which, in Celtic times, some experts believe might well have served as a place of cult worship; druids possibly maintained a cult of the horse here.

Golden Horse hill conceals the most extensive cave system in Bohemia, accidentally discovered after an explosion in a nearby limestone quarry in 1950 and subsequently were made accessible for the public in 1959. Spanning two kilometers and three levels, the cave system inside the Zlatý kůň hill consists of passages and domed chambers interconnected by shafts developed in limestone of the Devonian age. The caves were formed by a small stream at the end of the Tertiary period, as well as by rainfall that seeped through cracks in the limestone. Rich speleothem formations were created by copious amounts of stalagmites and stalactites as well as by little sinter lakes. A tour leads visitors through the upper and middle levels, that present a chain of domed chambers, caverns and passages with dark abysses between them. The most beautiful area is deemed by experts to be the extensive Prošek chamber with its sinter Jezírko lásky (Little lake of love). The cave also offers the spectacular "Koněprusy Roses", a sight that cannot be found anywhere else in the world. They were formed by calcium carbonate dissolved in water, which then gradually precipitated on the walls of the underground lake in the shape of bushes, the tips of which later fell away to create an unusual formation reminiscent of rose blooms.

Findings
In the earth filled parts of the caves paleontologists have excavated thousands of prehistoric animal bones from the Pleistocene period. Dating back 200,000 to 300,000 years, findings include the remains of the ancestors of the elephant mastodon, sabre-tooth tiger, monkey, cave bear, deer, reindeer, cave lion, woolly rhino, wolf, beaver, hyena and horse amongst others.

The fossilized bones of prehistoric humans aged about 45,000 years, stone tools and decorative objects from the early Stone Age provide evidence that prehistoric man also found refuge in the caves. A counterfeiter's workshop, since dubbed "the Mint", was discovered by pot holers on the upper level of the caves. Here from 1460 to 1470 unknown forgers made the Hussite coins bearing the symbol of the Czech lion. Instead of silver they used copper thinly covered with silver amalgam. The descended underground through a shaft near the top of the Golden Horse hill. It offers panoramic views in all directions; when the weather is fine about one-sixth of Bohemia is visible.

See also
Moravian Karst

References

External links

Koněprusy Caves Official Website 
Cave Administration of the Czech Republic 

Show caves in the Czech Republic
Caves of the Czech Republic
Prehistoric sites in the Czech Republic
Archaeological sites in the Czech Republic
Beroun District
Tourist attractions in the Czech Republic
Tourist attractions in the Central Bohemian Region